Troksky Uyezd (Трокский уезд) was one of the seven subdivisions of the Vilna Governorate of the Russian Empire. It was situated in the western part of the governorate. Its administrative centre was Trakai.

Demographics
At the time of the Russian Empire Census of 1897, Troksky Uyezd had a population of 203,401. Of these, 58.1% spoke Lithuanian, 15.7% Belarusian, 11.3% Polish, 9.5% Yiddish, 4.6% Russian, 0.4% Tatar, 0.2% German and 0.1% Ukrainian as their native language.

References

 
Uezds of Vilna Governorate
Vilna Governorate